Janet Manyowa is a Zimbabwean gospel musician.

Early background
Janet Manyowa was born in Harare and resided in Chegutu. Her parents identified her passion for music and they sent her to music school at the age of ten. Her career started when she was leading praise and worship in her hometown church.

Career
Janet Manyowa released her debut album, King of Glory in August 2015 following the success of the singles Amazing God and Ndomira Pamuri followed by her second album Grateful which was launched in 2017 at the Celebration Centre Auditorium. The launch event featured prominent South African gospel musicians Dr Tumi, Ntokozo Mbambo and Nqubeko Mbatha who she featured on the song, You Are More.

At the start of 2017, Janet launched a new TV talk show called Redeemed. The talk show is based on gospel music and interviews various artists and industry leaders and Christians who have a story of redemption to talk about.

She has been listed among the 100 most influential young Zimbabweans under 40 in 2018 and 2021 she was listed as one of the top 50 most inspirational Women in Zimbabwe according to the Institute of Corporate Directors in Zimbabwe.

In 2020, Janet Manyowa was appointed brand ambassador for ZB Bank Limited and Rainbow Tourism Group, she currently seats as the Board Treasurer of the Zimbabwe Music Rights Association.

Discography

Albums
 King of Glory (2015)
 Grateful (2017)
 Sounds of victory (2020)

Singles
 Muchengeti featuring Shingisai Suluma
 King of Glory
 Overcome
 Tarisa
 Ndomira Pamuri
 I Trust You (The Reprise)
 Ufanelwe
 Amazing God feat. Dr. Comfort Manyame
 Kune Muponesi feat. Michael Mahendere
 Muripo
 Amazing God (Saxophone Version)
 Zadzisa
 Nyasha neNgoni
 Ndimi
 Ngatimukudzei Mwari
 Tariro
 Mbiri

Charts performance
Song of the Year (Kune Muponesi feat. Michael Mahendere) - Star FM Gospel Greats 2016
Song of the Year (Zadzisa) - Star FM Zimbabwe Gospel Greats 2017
Song of the Year (Zadzisa) - Diamond FM top 100 2017
Song of the Year (Zadzisa) - Power FM Zimbabwe top 100 2017
Song of the Year (Zadzisa) - ZiFM Stereo 2017
Ngatimukudzei Mwari - Rainbow FM South Africa Gospel Top 20 (number 1)
Ndimi - Trace Africa Gospel Hit 30 in 2020
Song of The Year (Nyasha neNengoni) - Power FM Zimbabwe charts in 2019

Awards and recognition
In the 3 years that Janet has been in music, she has received over 42 nominations and 23 awards, some of these are:
 Best Newcomer 2015—Zimbabwe Music Awards  (ZIMA)
 Best Album 2016— PERMICAN Gospel Awards
 Best Female Artist 2016—Zimbabwe Music Awards  (ZIMA)
 Best of Africa 2017 (nominee)— SABC Crown Gospel Awards
 Outstanding Female Musician 2017— NAMA (National Arts Merit Awards)
 Notable Musician 2018 - Zimbabwe Women Awards (ZIWA)
 Gospel Song of the year 2018(Zadzisa) — Star FM Music Awards
 Female Artist of the year 2018 — Star FM Music Awards
Outstanding Female Musician 2019 - National Arts Merit Awards 
Best Female Act 2019 - Star FM Music Awards 2019
Best Female Musician, Album of the Year, Video of the Year (Nyash neNgoni), Best Songwriter 2019 - Permican Gospel Awards
Best Contemporary Gospel Musician 2020 - Zimbabwe Music Awards
Best Female Artist, Gospel Song of the Year (Ndimi) 2020 - Star FM Music Awards
Best Collaboration (feat. Tembalami) 2020 - Maranatha Africa Continental Awards
Best Female Musician 2021 - Zimbabwe Music Awards
Best Album of the Year 2021 (Sounds of Victory) - Zimbabwe Music Awards

Personal life
Janet is married to Munyaradzi Manyowa and together they have 3 children, Matipa, Waishe and Mufaro. She is an accountant by profession.

References

1985 births
21st-century Zimbabwean women singers
Living people
Zimbabwean composers
Zimbabwean songwriters